The Valeyard  is a fictional character from the long-running British science fiction television series, Doctor Who. He is described by the Master as an amalgamation of the Doctor's darker sides from between his twelfth and final incarnations. In the story The Trial of a Time Lord, comprising the whole of Season 23, the High Council of the Time Lords appoint the Valeyard as prosecutor at the Sixth Doctor's trial, hoping to have him executed and thereby remove the sole witness to their near destruction of life on Earth.

Character history

In the show
The Valeyard appears in all four segments of the 1986 serial The Trial of a Time Lord – The Mysterious Planet, Mindwarp, Terror of the Vervoids and The Ultimate Foe. In episode 4 of The Mysterious Planet it is stated that "valeyard" means "learned court prosecutor" in Gallifreyan.

During the course of the trial, the Doctor was accused of "conduct unbecoming a Time Lord" and transgressing the First Law of Time. As prosecutor, the Valeyard presented the events of The Mysterious Planet and Mindwarp as extracts from the Matrix, the computer network that serves as the repository of all Time Lord knowledge. The Valeyard used these extracts as evidence of the Doctor's meddling in time and space. Throughout the presentation of the evidence the Doctor barked at the Valeyard, calling him names such as "the Boneyard," "the Scrapyard," and "the Knacker's Yard," and only the interventions of the Inquisitor, another Time Lord, kept the trial going.

What was not discovered until later was that the Matrix extracts had been tampered with to show the Doctor in the worst possible light. The Doctor was unable to directly contradict some of the actions shown, as his extraction from time had disoriented his memory. In The Mysterious Planet this involved the editing of particular scenes. Scenes of the mercenary Sabalom Glitz attempting to buy "secrets" from the robot Drathro were censored completely. In Mindwarp substantial portions of the extract were falsified entirely by the Valeyard. The most significant alteration was when the Time Lords intervened in the brain transplant experiments of Lord Kiv and his scientist Crozier. In the Matrix extract, it appeared that Yrcanos was maneuvered into killing the Mentors after Kiv's mind had been transplanted into the body of the Doctor's companion Peri – the Doctor having apparently abandoned Peri to save himself after exposure to one of the machines in the lab temporarily altered his personality – effectively killing her.

When the Doctor presented in his defence the future events of Terror of the Vervoids, he began to suspect that the Valeyard was tampering with the evidence – having reviewed the evidence before presenting it and noting some differences between what he had witnessed then and what was now being displayed – but lacked proof. The Doctor was shown being forced to destroy the human-plant hybrids known as the Vervoids when they ran rampant on a space liner. If they had been allowed to reach Earth, they would have eliminated all animal life. The Valeyard argued that this meant the Doctor had committed genocide.

In The Ultimate Foe, the Master appeared in the Matrix, revealing that it was possible to infiltrate it. Sabalom Glitz and the Doctor's future companion Melanie Bush were presented to the Court to rebut the Valeyard's accusations. It was then revealed by the Master that the Valeyard was, in fact, the Doctor himself – or rather, an amalgamation of the darker sides of the Doctor's nature, from somewhere between his twelfth and final incarnations. This concept is similar to the ethereal "Watcher" that manifested itself to bridge the gap between the Doctor's fourth and fifth incarnations (Logopolis).  However, in the novelisation of the story the Master states "The Valeyard, Doctor, is your penultimate reincarnation... Somewhere between your twelfth and thirteenth regeneration".

The Valeyard was also revealed to be acting at the behest of the High Council of Time Lords to cover its corruption in the Ravalox affair. The "secrets" that Glitz had been seeking were information from the Matrix. Ravalox was Earth in approximately 2,000,000 AD, but the Time Lords moved it through space, killing virtually every human being living on it. To prevent the Doctor discovering the secret and revealing it, they used the Valeyard to try to have the Doctor executed under the pretence of a trial. The reward for the Valeyard's actions would have been to give him all of the Doctor's remaining regenerations and make his existence concrete. However, the Valeyard would then have slain every member of the Court as well, using a particle disseminator located within the Matrix.

The Doctor entered the Matrix and fought and defeated the Valeyard in a fictional world of his creation. The Inquisitor revealed that Peri had indeed survived and was married to Yrcanos. The Master and the Valeyard appeared to be trapped in the Matrix, with the Valeyard apparently being destroyed by the feedback from the particle disseminator, but at the end of the serial, the Valeyard was seen disguised as the Keeper of the Matrix. The subsequent whereabouts of the Valeyard have never been disclosed in the television series.

In the 2013 episode "The Name of the Doctor", the Great Intelligence states that "Valeyard" is one of the names by which the Doctor will be known before the end of his life. In the 2017 episode "Twice Upon a Time", the entity Testimony tells the First Doctor that one of his future titles is "the Shadow of the Valeyard".

In other media
The Valeyard has appeared in some of the spin-off media. In these stories, the Doctor is aware that he has the potential to become the Valeyard and tries to step away from any path that might lead him to that future. In the Virgin Publishing Missing Adventure Millennial Rites by Craig Hinton, the Sixth Doctor succumbed to his darker side and became the Valeyard very briefly due to reality being destabilised by three competing laws of physics being concentrated in one place, allowing the dormant potential of the Valeyard within the Doctor to take control of his body, but the Doctor's true persona was able to regain control when he nearly killed an innocent child. In a confrontation with the Valeyard in his mind, the Doctor accepted the Valeyard's argument that the more ruthless course of action could sometimes be necessary, but rejected the Valeyard's belief that he had to enjoy such actions to commit them.

Throughout the New Adventures, the Seventh Doctor is tormented by the knowledge that he might become the Valeyard, with it being implied that his potential presence in the Doctor's mind drove the Sixth Doctor to commit "suicide" by allowing the TARDIS to be caught in the Rani's tractor beam. With this revelation, the memory of the Sixth Doctor becomes increasingly associated with the Valeyard in the Seventh Doctor's mind, causing the past five Doctors – each one based on the present Doctor's memories of what they were like – to "lock" the Sixth Doctor's memory away for fear of what he might become. However, in The Room with No Doors, the Doctor learns to forgive himself for his past sins, removing the guilt that would have led to the Valeyard's creation and freeing the Sixth Doctor from the room as the Seventh accepts the Sixth Doctor as part of himself rather than focusing on his predecessor's flaws.

In the BBC Books novel The Eight Doctors, by Terrance Dicks, the Eighth Doctor returns to the trial of the Sixth Doctor and rescues him from an alternative timeline in which the Sixth Doctor is about to be executed by the Valeyard before Mel and Glitz's arrival, the Eighth Doctor denouncing the charge of genocide as ludicrous due to the Vervoids having been artificially created rather than a naturally-evolving species. The Master reinforces the statement made in The Ultimate Foe to the Eighth Doctor—that the Valeyard is "an amalgam of the Doctor's darker side, somewhere between his twelfth and thirteenth regenerations."  This combined with the information from The Twin Dilemma reinforces the idea that the Valeyard is indeed the Doctor's thirteenth and last "normal" incarnation. While the Sixth Doctor faces the Valeyard, the Eighth Doctor arranges for a restored Borusa to lead a committee of inquiry into the events that led to the Valeyard's creation and the Sixth Doctor's trial, but the crisis concludes with the Valeyard's apparent disappearance before the Eighth and Sixth Doctors resume their travels.

In the Past Doctor Adventures novel Mission: Impractical by David A. McIntee, the villainous Mr Zimmerman, a renegade Time Lord who had hired two assassins to kill the Doctor, refers to the Sixth Doctor as "I" before correcting himself. McIntee has confirmed that this is a subtle hint that Zimmerman was actually the Valeyard.

In Matrix by Robert Perry and Mike Tucker, the Valeyard again appears, and encounters the Seventh Doctor. After possessing the body of the Keeper, he acquires control over the Dark Matrix, the repository of all of the Time Lords' most evil impulses, and tries to use it to take revenge on the Doctor. To this end, he travels to London in 1888, taking on the identity of Jack the Ripper, and using the Ripper murders as sacrifices to power the Dark Matrix, believing that he can use and control the Matrix to grant himself a true existence independent of the Doctor. Once it has enough power, the Dark Matrix will be unleashed on the world, creating a dystopian nightmare and corrupting history forever. As an added bonus, the Valeyard has tracked down all thirteen incarnations of the Doctor, using the influence of the Dark Matrix to corrupt each Doctor into dark and twisted versions of themselves (notably resulting in the First Doctor murdering other Time Lords during his escape from Gallifrey, the Fourth Doctor destroying the Daleks at their creation, and the Fifth Doctor using bat's milk to cure himself from spectrox poisoning while leaving Peri to succumb to the toxin in his place), using their corrupted spirits to animate golems to do his work. However, the Seventh Doctor escapes the Valeyard's attack by sealing his conscious mind away from the assault in the TARDIS telepathic circuits, although this briefly leaves him as nothing more than an amnesic cardsharp who calls himself "Johnny". Having regained his memory after retrieving the circuits, the Doctor confronts the Valeyard (now calling himself "the Ripper" on the grounds that the name is more evocative) in a church where the Ripper has left his TARDIS, now reprogrammed into the appearance of the Doctor's tomb, causing his foe to lose control of the Dark Matrix, provoking it by revealing that the Dark Matrix is just as trapped under the Valeyard's control as it was on Gallifrey. The Valeyard is eventually killed by a lightning bolt being generated by his damaged TARDIS as it collapses while the Dark Matrix tries to escape, his body disappearing as the spirits of the other twelve Doctors seemingly depart in spectral versions of the TARDIS around the Seventh, and history is restored to normal.

A novel from the late Doctor Who author Craig Hinton, Time's Champion, was to have featured the Valeyard once again alongside the sixth incarnation of the Doctor. Connecting plot lines from the Virgin novels' New and Missing Adventures range, the narrative centred upon the circumstances involving the sixth Doctor's regeneration and also the purpose and origins of the Valeyard.   A synopsis of the novel was rejected by BBC Books (who published another novel dealing with the Sixth Doctor's regeneration, Spiral Scratch, around the same time). According to Hinton's friend and co-writer Chris McKeon, this compelled McKeon to begin working on an unofficial publication of the book, based in part on the six chapter synopsis (and including the three pages of text) Hinton had completed. McKeon would go on to complete the novel upon Hinton's death. The novel was edited and published by David J. Howe as a benefit for the British Heart Foundation.

The Big Finish Productions' Doctor Who Unbound audio drama He Jests at Scars... documents an alternative timeline in which the Valeyard, once again voiced by Michael Jayston, has defeated the Doctor (in the aftermath of the trial) and gone on to ransack time and space. He has forged an empire by carefully eliminating time sensitives and altering his own (i.e. the Doctor's) past to his advantage, monopolising time travel and claiming the various doomsday weapons the Doctor left buried and concealed for his own use. The Doctor's companion Mel, hardened by many years of dark experience, eventually tracks him down with a view to assassinating the Valeyard after confirming that there is nothing of the Doctor left in him, but finds that he has become the victim of his own time meddling, the Valeyard himself acknowledging that he lacked the Doctor's compassion and ability to acknowledge when not to do something, so eager to act that he never truly stopped to consider the consequences of doing so in the belief that he could just go back and restore events later. Eventually, the Valeyard's actions begin to twist his own personal history, such as accidentally killing the Fourth Doctor, or planning to kill the First Doctor's companion Dodo Chaplet to stop the Doctor visiting a planet for a holiday at the same time as the Valeyard destroyed it, with the result that most of his 'empire' was actually an illusion; in reality, the Valeyard had trapped himself inside the TARDIS, terrified even to move in case he makes things worse. When the TARDIS runs out of power, the illusions it has created break down, leaving the Valeyard and Mel trapped in the console room floating in the heart of the Time Vortex, the stasis fields only able to allow them to talk but running out of the power necessary to permit even that. Mel and a seemingly repentant, broken Valeyard suffer the penalty for breaking the Time Lords' first law, and become trapped in the TARDIS, perhaps forever enmeshed in the centre of the web of time until the necessary millennia have elapsed for reality to recover from the damage the Valeyard had done to it.

The IDW Doctor Who comic series The Forgotten written by Tony Lee featured another individual calling himself "The Valeyard", who claimed to be the Meta-Crisis Doctor, but this was revealed to be a disguise taken by a cranial parasite while it and the Tenth Doctor were trapped in the TARDIS' matrix.

The Time Traveller's Companion, a supplement for the Doctor Who – Adventures in Time and Space: The Roleplaying Game, implies that the Valeyard is a rogue Watcher, similar to the one produced in Logopolis, generated during the regeneration of the Twelfth Doctor into the Thirteenth. This Watcher, presumed to possess all the most negative traits of the Doctor's darker nature, refused to rejoin with the Time Lord and escaped into the wider universe to eventually put the Doctor on trial.

Another Big Finish audio, Trial of the Valeyard, has the Valeyard captured and put on trial by the Time Lords, but he requests that the Sixth Doctor act as his defence, provoking the Doctor into accepting the deal by offering to tell the Doctor about his origins. The Valeyard claims he was created on a planet orbiting Eta Rho by the Thirteenth Doctor, who was experimenting with ways to break the regeneration limit. He is able to escape through the Matrix, retreating to Eta Rho and attempting to kill the Doctor with a bomb disguised as the 'Black Scrolls' of the Doctor's future self, the Valeyard posing as a senile old man who was apparently the Thirteenth Doctor. The Doctor sees through the deception and the Valeyard escapes again, leaving the Doctor to contemplate that the Valeyard may have included some truth in his story even if he denounces the overall picture as a lie.

In the audio The Sixth Doctor: The Last Adventure, the Valeyard masterminds a complex plot to infect the TARDIS with an alien intelligence that will allow him to subvert the Doctor and take control of his body while drawing on the Doctor's own negative emotional energy to restore himself. This plan brings him in contact with the Sixth Doctor at various points in his life, the Valeyard restoring his energy in an encounter in a pocket universe while the Doctor is travelling with Constance Clarke (End of the Line), stealing a crucial piece of equipment on a planet inhabited by 'werewolves' while the Doctor is with Charley Pollard (The Red House), and gaining new energy in a confrontation in Victorian London with the Doctor, Flip Jackson, Professor Litefoot, and Henry Gordon Jago (Stage Fright). Although the Valeyard's plan succeeds in allowing him to essentially 'transplant' himself over the Doctor's timeline with the goal that he will then spread throughout the Matrix and replace all other Time Lords, the remnants of the Doctor's psyche in the Matrix after his 'death' are able to undo the Valeyard's attack by reaching back into his past and prompting his past self to set a course that will expose the TARDIS to a dangerous form of radiation, causing the Sixth Doctor to regenerate and thus purging his body of the Valeyard's influence, leaving his foe trapped in the Matrix as his victory is erased (The Brink of Death).

The Valeyard returns in the third volume of The Time War, chronicling the Eighth Doctor's experiences during the Time War, when the Valeyard returns to existence as the Time Lords attempt to recruit him to act for their side in the War. As explained in the audio The War Valeyard, rather than coming from the Doctor's future, this version of the Valeyard is 'extracted' from the Doctor when he used a transmat after assisting another Time Lord on a mission involving exposure to a device that could manipulate biology, with the Time Lords deciding to utilise the Valeyard as a soldier in the Time War as he retains the Doctor's guile and intelligence without his morality, willing to carry out missions that would endanger planets and civilians that the Doctor would reject. Eventually, the Time Lords sent the new Valeyard to investigate a Dalek weapon that is supposedly capable of erasing the Time Lords from history. However, when the Valeyard attempts to turn the weapon on the Daleks, the Time Lords are forced to trap the planet in a time loop as the weapon's side-effects cause a small army of Daleks to still exist on that planet even after the Daleks themselves have been erased. His memory damaged by the weapon, the Valeyard comes to believe that he is the Doctor, fighting the illusionary Daleks created by the weapon's destruction. The Eighth Doctor briefly penetrates the time loop to investigate the Valeyard's existence, but accepts the Valeyard's request to remain on that world so that his other self can continue to believe he is the Doctor fighting the Daleks in a simpler conflict.

List of appearances

Television
The Mysterious Planet
Mindwarp
Terror of the Vervoids
The Ultimate Foe

Novels
Mission: Impractical (behind the scenes; does not explicitly appear)
Millennial Rites (his dormant potential manifests from the Sixth Doctor, although his words imply that the 'true' Valeyard is involved)
Time's Champion (non-canon novel)
Matrix (faces the Seventh Doctor while acting as Jack the Ripper; traps wraiths based on corrupted versions of the other twelve Doctors)
The Eight Doctors (briefly appears in the Sixth Doctor's era, but does not meet the Eighth Doctor directly)

Audio drama
He Jests at Scars... (alternate timeline where the Valeyard defeated the Doctor and destroyed the Web of Time)
Trial of the Valeyard (captured by the Time Lords some time after the trial)
The Sixth Doctor: The Last Adventure (appears across the Sixth Doctor's history collecting components for a new plan)
The Eighth Doctor: The Time War 3- The War Valeyard (new version of the Valeyard manifesting from the Doctor travelling through a transmat device while holding a machine designed to manipulate the subject's genetic structure)

See also
Twelfth Doctor
Thirteenth Doctor

References

External links

Doctor Who audio characters
Doctor Who Doctors
Television characters introduced in 1986
Male characters in television
Recurring characters in Doctor Who